The 1978 United States Senate election in Maine was held on November 7, 1978. Incumbent Democratic U.S. Senator William Hathaway ran for re-election to a second term, but was defeated by William Cohen, the Republican U.S. Representative from Maine's 2nd congressional district. 

No incumbent Senator has lost by such a large margin since Hathaway's 22.65-point loss, though James Abdnor in 1980, John Boozman in 2010, and Tommy Tuberville in 2020 all received larger percentages of the vote than Cohen's 56.59% against incumbent Senators.

Background 
Elected to the U.S. Senate in 1972 in an upset victory against incumbent Margaret Chase Smith, Hathaway had established himself as a very liberal senator, being ranked an average of 92 percent more liberal than the Senate as a whole during his first term. This put him at risk, considering the conservative nature of Maine before the 1990s. Meanwhile, young former state senator Hayes Gahagan launched an independent campaign, running well to the right of Cohen. Other candidates to join the race were independent John J. Jannace and perennial candidate Plato Truman.

Republican primary

Results

|+ Republican Senate primary results: June 13, 1978
! Year
!
! Candidate
! Votes
! %
|-
|1978
||
| |William Cohen
| |69,824
| |100
||

Democratic primary

Results

|+ Democratic Senate primary results: June 13, 1978
! Year
!
! Candidate
! Votes
! %
!
! Candidate
! Votes
! %
|-
|1978
||
| |William D. Hathaway (inc.)
| |48,453 
| |99.83
||
| |Write-In
| |84
| |0.17

General election

Candidates
 William Cohen, U.S. Representative from Bangor
 Hayes Gahagan, former State Senator from Caribou (Independent)
 William Hathaway, incumbent United States Senator (Democratic)
 John J. Jannace (Independent)
 Plato Truman (Independent)

Campaign
During the campaign, all candidates hit the campaign trail hard, with Hathaway receiving significant support from Jimmy Carter, Edmund Muskie, Ted Kennedy, and other national Democrats. The biggest surprise, however, came from Hayes Gahagan. Shortly before election day, he held a press conference where he announced that "unknown, subversive agents" had been altering his campaign photos by implanting subliminal images of female genitalia in his hairline.

Results

See also 
 1978 United States Senate elections

References 

1978 Maine elections
Maine
1978